Keith Raymond Tower (born May 15, 1970) is an American former professional basketball player.

A 6'11" center from Libby, Montana and the University of Notre Dame, Tower was never drafted by an NBA team but did manage to play in four NBA seasons from 1993 to 1997. He played for the Orlando Magic, Los Angeles Clippers and Milwaukee Bucks. In his NBA career, Tower played in 53 games and scored a total of 98 points.

Tower is the co-founder and senior pastor of HighPoint Church, with former NBA player Andrew DeClercq. Coincidentally, both players wore No. 55 during their careers.

Career statistics

NBA

|-
| align="left" | 1993–94
| align="left" | Orlando
| 11 || 0 || 2.9 || .444 || .000 || .000 || 0.5 || 0.1 || 0.0 || 0.0 || 0.7
|-
| align="left" | 1994–95
| align="left" | Orlando
| 3 || 0 || 2.3 || .000 || .000 || .500 || 1.0 || 0.0 || 0.0 || 0.0 || 0.3
|-
| align="left" | 1995–96
| align="left" | Los Angeles
| 34 || 1 || 9.0 || .444 || .000 || .692 || 1.5 || 0.1 || 0.1 || 0.3 || 2.4
|-
| align="left" | 1996–97
| align="left" | Milwaukee
| 5 || 1 || 14.4 || .375 || .000 || .125 || 1.8 || 0.2 || 0.4 || 0.2 || 1.4
|- class="sortbottom"
| style="text-align:center;" colspan="2"| Career
| 53 || 2 || 7.8 || .429 || .000 || .556 || 1.3 || 0.1 || 0.1 || 0.2 || 1.8
|}

College

|-
| align="left" | 1988–89
| align="left" | Notre Dame
| 29 || 5 || 11.3 || .560 || .000 || .455 || 2.8 || 0.3 || 0.1 || 0.6 || 2.4
|-
| align="left" | 1989–90
| align="left" | Notre Dame
| 25 || - || 11.0 || .311 || .000 || .600 || 2.7 || 0.2 || 0.2 || 0.2 || 2.1
|-
| align="left" | 1990–91
| align="left" | Notre Dame
| 32 || - || 30.3 || .464 || .000 || .632 || 7.0 || 1.7 || 0.6 || 0.6 || 7.9
|-
| align="left" | 1991–92
| align="left" | Notre Dame
| 31 || - || 25.0 || .396 || .000 || .545 || 5.3 || 1.4 || 0.5 || 0.8 || 4.3
|- class="sortbottom"
| style="text-align:center;" colspan="2"| Career
| 117 || 5 || 20.1 || .434 || .000 || .573 || 4.6 || 0.9 || 0.4 || 0.6 || 4.4
|}

External links
Stats at basketballreference.com
HighPoint Church

1970 births
Living people
American expatriate basketball people in Argentina
American expatriate basketball people in Japan
American expatriate basketball people in Poland
American expatriate basketball people in Spain
American men's basketball players
Basketball players from Montana
Centers (basketball)
Columbus Horizon players
Fort Wayne Fury players
La Crosse Bobcats players
Liga ACB players
Los Angeles Clippers players
Milwaukee Bucks players
Notre Dame Fighting Irish men's basketball players
Orlando Magic players
People from Libby, Montana
Undrafted National Basketball Association players